Jean Jacques Raynaldy (23 December 1869 – 15 June 1938), known as Eugène Raynaldy, was a French politician who was a deputy from 1919 to 1928 and a senator from 1930 to 1938.
He was Minister of Commerce and Industry in 1924–25 and Minister of Justice in 1933–34.

Early years

Jean Jacques Raynaldy was born on 23 December 1869 in Rodez, Aveyron, to a family of modest means.
He managed to obtain a legal education and became a successful attorney in Rodez.
He was a moderate Republican, and presented his political ideas in articles he wrote for the regional press, particularly the Courrier de l'Aveyron.
He ran in the general elections of 1910 as deputy for Aveyron but was defeated.
He tried again in a by-election in 1912, but again lost. 
He did not run in the 1914 elections.

Political career

In 1919 Raynaldy was elected municipal councilor in Rodez, and was mayor of the town from 1925 to 1935.
In 1922 he was elected to the general council of the Aveyron department.
On 16 November 1919 Raynaldy was elected deputy on the Left Republican Union list. He was reelected on 11 May 1924.
He was Minister of Commerce and Industry from 14 June 1924 to 17 April 1925 in the first cabinet of Édouard Herriot.
He was defeated in the general elections of 1928.

Raynaldy was elected senator for Aveyron on 20 October 1929, and joined the Democratic and Radical Union.
He was Minister of Justice from 26 November 1933 to 27 January 1934 in the second cabinet of Camille Chautemps.
While in office he was accused of being involved with the frauds of the Sacazan Bank.
The right-wing Action Française stirred up demonstrations with the objective of bringing about the fall of the Chautemps cabinet.
On Saturday 27 January 1934 the Camelots du Roi came out in force in Paris, causing considerable damage.
That afternoon Raynaldy resigned, followed by Chautemps.

Raynaldy suffered from heart problems, and was forced to retire to his home in Rodez, where he died on 15 June 1938 aged 68.
A square in Rodez with a fountain is named after him.

Notes

Sources

1869 births
1938 deaths
People from Rodez
Politicians from Occitania (administrative region)
Democratic Republican Alliance politicians
French Ministers of Commerce and Industry
French Ministers of Justice
Members of the 12th Chamber of Deputies of the French Third Republic
Members of the 13th Chamber of Deputies of the French Third Republic
French Senators of the Third Republic
Senators of Aveyron